Dustin is a daily comic strip created by Steve Kelley, editorial cartoonist for the Pittsburgh Post-Gazette,  and Jeff Parker, editorial cartoonist for Florida Today.  It is carried by King Features Syndicate and debuted on January 4, 2010.  Dustin won the National Cartoonists Society Reuben Award for Best Newspaper Comic Strip in 2010, and again in 2017
. Focusing on the present boomerang generation and post-2008 recession period, it also deals with varying topics from everyday life and social commentary.

Dustin was initially planned as a collaboration between Kelley and Steve Breen, who was Kelley's successor as the staff editorial cartoonist of the San Diego Union Tribune after Kelley was fired from that position in 2001.  Breen later decided not to proceed with Dustin, leading to a 2008 lawsuit by Kelley against the owners of the Union Tribune, alleging that Breen had been improperly pressured not to collaborate with Kelley; the case was dismissed in 2009, but reinstated in 2011.

At its outset Dustin was carried in more than 100 newspapers nationwide, and by October 2010 it had expanded to 300. In several papers, Dustin was the replacement strip for Cathy, which ended its run in papers on October 3, 2010.

Characters

Dustin Kudlick, the titular character of the comic strip. A 23-year-old college graduate who has failed to find regular employment in the current economy after graduating and thus moved back home to live with his parents. He is constantly trapped in a cycle of dead-end temp jobs and grueling manual labor, frequently shown putting in long hours at a car wash or asking his supervisor at the temp agency for more career-enhancing assignments that might help him break out of the cycle of wage slavery. He also deals with trouble in developing relationships with women, as well as depression and a severe sleep disorder, both of which go unremarked by his callous family.
Despite his dysfunctional family atmosphere, Dustin remains stoic, a heroic everyman and inspiration to the reader, as he endures and strives, trying to find financial stability, a sense of vocation, acceptance from his family, and even happiness itself.

Ed Kudlick, Dustin's father, is an angry, bitter lawyer who despises Dustin's apparent laziness. Ed is never supportive in any way, and always seeks to crush Dustin's attempts to find meaning and useful employment, ceaselessly mocking his son and putting him down; the only thing they consistently have in common is their love of golf. In 2023, Ed inexplicably took up pole vaulting as a hobby, despite having expressed no interested in the prior decade.
 	
Helen Kudlick, Dustin's mother, is a radio advice talk-show host of "Here's Helen," who occasionally endures one airheaded marijuana-advocate caller named Carl with some of his crazy questions. Always keeping faith that her son will do well eventually, even though she does have a shopaholic problem, especially over shoes. Contemporary story arcs also involve Helen exploring relationships with other men after Ed signed up for pole vaulting lessons.

Megan Kudlick, Dustin's teenaged sister, seven years younger than her brother, also resides in the house. A bit of an overachiever, she tends to follow their father's example in insulting and undercutting Dustin at every possible turn, showing how poor parenting can poison the next generation as well. But at times they do share moments of true sibling bonding, and she sometimes encourages him to keep trying.

Simone Fontenot, the salty owner of TurboTemps, a one-woman employment agency. Simone provides Dustin with temporary job assignments and unending criticism, sarcasm and almost always mispronounces his last name. She bears an unsettling resemblance to Ed in make-up and a wig.

Kevin Fitch, Dustin's best friend, who actually works but is less ambitious and intelligent than Dustin is.

Hayden, a precocious seven-year-old kid and next-door neighbor living with his single mother who balances between wisdom and antagonism for Dustin.

External links
 Official site

References

American comic strips
Slice of life comics
Comics set in the United States
Male characters in comics
2010 comics debuts
Comic strips started in the 2010s